Acanthoderes is a genus of beetles in the family Cerambycidae, containing the following species:

 Acanthoderes albifrons Chemsak & Hovore, 2002
 Acanthoderes aliciae Chemsak & Hovore, 2002
 Acanthoderes alpina Chemsak & Hovore, 2002
 Acanthoderes amplifrons Chemsak & Hovore, 2002
 Acanthoderes amplitoris Chemsak & Hovore, 2002
 Acanthoderes ariasi Chemsak & Hovore, 2002
 Acanthoderes bicolor Chemsak & Hovore, 2002
 Acanthoderes cavei Chemsak & Hovore, 2002
 Acanthoderes daviesii (Swederus, 1787)
 Acanthoderes ferruginea Chemsak & Hovore, 2002
 Acanthoderes flavomaculata Chemsak & Hovore, 2002
 Acanthoderes funeraria Bates, 1861
 Acanthoderes giesberti Chemsak & Hovore, 2002
 Acanthoderes hondurae Chemsak & Hovore, 2002
 Acanthoderes laevicollis Bates, 1872
 Acanthoderes laportei Aurivillius, 1923
 Acanthoderes latevittata Aurivillius, 1921
 Acanthoderes latiforma Chemsak & Hovore, 2002
 Acanthoderes linsleyi Chemsak & Hovore, 2002
 Acanthoderes noguerai Chemsak & Hovore, 2002
 Acanthoderes paravetusta Chemsak & Hovore, 2002
 Acanthoderes parva Chemsak & Hovore, 2002
 Acanthoderes parvimacula Zajciw, 1964
 Acanthoderes quattuordecimguttata (Schoenherr, 1817)
 Acanthoderes rubripes Bates, 1872
 Acanthoderes rufofemorata Aurivillius, 1926
 Acanthoderes satanas Bates, 1880
 Acanthoderes septemmaculata Buquet, 1859
 Acanthoderes solisi Chemsak & Hovore, 2002
 Acanthoderes subtessellata Bates, 1880
 Acanthoderes thammi Bates, 1880
 Acanthoderes zischkai Tippmann, 1960
 Acanthoderes zonata Bates, 1880

References

 
Acanthoderini